Van is a very common prefix in Dutch language surnames, where it is known as a tussenvoegsel. In those cases it nearly always refers to a certain, often quite distant, ancestor's place of origin or residence; for example, Ludwig van Beethoven "from Bettenhoven" and Rembrandt van Rijn "from the Rhine". Van is also a preposition in the Dutch and Afrikaans languages, meaning "of" or "from" depending on the context (similar to da, de and di in the Romance languages).

In surnames, it can appear by itself or in combination with an article (compare French de la, de l). The most common cases of this are van de, van der and van den, where the articles are all current or archaic forms of the article de "the". Less common are van het and van 't, which use the similar but grammatically neuter article het. The contraction ver-, based on van der''', is also common and can be written as a single word with the rest of the surname; an example being Johannes Vermeer (van der meer "of the lake").

Names in other languages may contain a component "Van" that is unrelated to the Dutch preposition. The very common Vietnamese middle name "Văn", often spelled in English text without diacritics, as in "Pham Van Tra", is a male given name, implying education.

 Related prepositions 

The preposition "van" is the most widely used preposition in Dutch surnames, but many others are also used, although not always recognised as such if the whole surname is written as a single word. Just as "van" all these prepositions used to indicate geographical locations:
 te — meaning "at" (or/of towards), (or ter and ten, being the old dative forms), e.g., ter Beek (of the stream)
 thoe/thor — being the old forms of te as in Thorbecke (meaning "at the brook")
 aan — meaning "at" or "aside" (also in combination aan de, aan den, aan het, aan 't), e.g., aan de Stegge (meaning aside the road)
 op — meaning "on" (also in combination op de, op der, op den, op ten, op 't, op het), e.g., as in Op den Akker (on the field)
 in — meaning "in" (also in combination in de, in den, in der, in het, in 't), in 't Veld (in the field)
 bij  — meaning "at" (exclusively in combination bij de, bij 't): Bij 't Vuur (at the fire)
 uit — or archaic uyt (uijt), meaning "out" or "from" (also in combination uit de, uit den, uit het, uyt de, uyt den, uijt de, uijt den, uijt ten), e.g. Uytdehaage (from The Hague or from the hedge).
 over — meaning "over" or "from the other side" (also in combination over de), as in Overeem (from the other side of the river Eem (river))
 onder — meaning "under" or "below" or "at the bottom" (also in combination onder de), Onderdijk, Onderwater
 achter — meaning "behind" (also in combination achter de) Achterberg (behind the mountain)
 bezuiden — meaning "south of": Bezuidenhout (south of the woods)
 boven — meaning "above" or "up": Bovelander (up in the land)
 buiten — meaning "outside" or "in the country": Buitenhuis (outside the house)
 voor  — meaning "in front of", (also in combination voor de, voor den, voor 't, voor in 't) 
 zonder — meaning "without": Zonderland (without land) or Zondervan (without van, e.g. without a surname beginning with van)

Apart from these prepositions the prefix "de" (not a preposition but an article, meaning "the") is also very common. They indicate a property, quality or origin, as in "de Lange" (the tall one), "de Korte" (the short one), "de Kleine" (the little one), "de Groot" (the big one), "de Zwart", "de Wit", "de Rode" (the one with black, white, red hair or skin), "de Rijke" (the rich one). The most widespread Dutch family name is "de Vries" (the Frisian).

For Dutch people of French (usually Huguenot) origin whose ancestors never modified their surnames to fit Dutch norms, the prefix "de" is a French preposition similar in meaning to "van".

Spelling conventions

Collation and capitalisation 
Collation and capitalisation of names differs between countries. In the Netherlands and Suriname, names starting with "van" are filed under the initial letter of the following name proper, so Johannes van der Waals is filed under "W", as: "Waals, Johannes van der" or "van der Waals, Johannes". The "v" is written in lower case, except when the surname is used as standalone (when the first name or initials are omitted), in which case it is capitalised, as in "de schilder Vincent van Gogh" and "de schilder Van Gogh ("the painter Van Gogh"). In compound terms like "de Van Goghtentoonstelling ("the Van Gogh exhibition") the "v" is capitalised, unless the connection between the person and the concept is or has become very weak.

In Belgium, any surnames beginning with "Van" or "van" are filed under "V". So for example Eric Van Rompuy is listed under the "V" section, not under the "R". The lowercase spelling in a name from the Netherlands is respected but not necessarily differentiated in alphabetical ordering and its Dutch style capitalisation for certain usages is generally unknown and thus not followed. The painter's full name, however, having become commonplace, is usually spelled Vincent Van Gogh in Belgium. In Flemish surnames the "V" is always capitalised though a following interjected "de", "den" ('the') or "der" ('of the', 'from the') usually stays lowercase.

In South Africa the Afrikaans surname Van der Merwe would be listed under the "v" section as is done in Belgium and not under "m" as in "Merwe, J. van der"; however, South Africa follows the same capitalisation convention as the Netherlands (thus, one would refer in English or in Afrikaans to a "Jan van der Merwe" when the first name is included, but simply to "Van der Merwe" when the first name is omitted).

In anglicised versions of Dutch names (as in Dick Van Dyke, George Vancouver, Martin Van Buren, Robert J. Van de Graaff), the "van is almost always capitalised in the United States, but in the British Isles some families of Dutch origin continue to use the Dutch form (e.g. Caroline van den Brul).

Where the "Van" is not of Dutch origin, such as in the Vietnamese middle name Wen or Van (as in Dương Văn Minh, Nguyễn Văn Thiệu), there is no reason to use a lower case "v".

Concatenation 
In some names, usually those of the Flemish/Belgian ones, and also some of the names of people from outside the Low Countries (with Dutch-speaking immigrant ancestors), the prefixes are concatenated to each other or to the name proper and form a single-worded or two-worded surnames, as in Vandervelde or Vande Velde. Prominent examples include "Vandenberg" and "Vanderbilt".

Nobility 
The German "von" is a linguistic cognate of the Dutch "van", however, unlike the German "von", the Dutch "van" is not indicative of the person's nobility or royalty. Van has a history of being used by commoners and nobility alike to simply signify ancestral relation to a particular place, (e.g. Willem van Oranje "William of [the] Orange [family]"; Jan van Ghent "John [who hails] from Ghent").

Prominent people with "van" in their surname

Abraham Van Helsing, fictional character (Dutch doctor & vampire hunter) from Bram Stoker's 1897 Gothic horror novel Dracula
Achille Van Acker (1898–1975), fourfold Prime Minister of Belgium
Harry van Kuyk (1929-2008), Graphic artist and designer
Adriaen van der Donck (c. 1618 – 1655), lawyer and landowner in New Netherland
Adriaen van der Werff (1659–1722), painter
Albertus van Raalte (1811–1876), Calvinist preacher and leader of Dutch immigrants to Michigan 
Alex Van Halen (born 1953), drummer of Van Halen
Andries van Wesel (1514–1564), anatomist & physician
Anna Maria van Schurman (1607–1678), polymath
Anneliese van der Pol (born 1984), actress and singer
Anthony van Dyck (1599–1641), painter
Antonie van Leeuwenhoek (1632–1723), scientist
Ariën Van Weesenbeek (born 1980), drummer
Armin van Buuren (born 1976), popular Trance DJ
Ben van Beurden (born 1958), Current CEO of Royal Dutch Shell plc.
Cameron van der Burgh (born 1988), swimmer
Carice van Houten (born 1976), actress 
Caroline van der Leeuw – Caro Emerald (born 1981), popular singer 
Claire van der Boom (born1983), actress
Cornelis Van Niel (1897–1985), microbiologist
Cornelius Vanderbilt (1794–1877), business magnate and philanthropist
Danielle van de Donk (born 1991), women's football player
Dick Van Dyke (born 1925), actor and comedian
Dutch van der Linde, fictional character (19th century outlaw leader of America's Wild West) from Rockstar Games' Red Dead game series.
Earl Van Dorn (1820–1863), Confederate general during the American Civil War. 
Eddie Van Halen (1955–2020), guitarist of Van Halen
Edwin van der Sar (born 1970), football player
Giedo van der Garde (born 1985), racing driver
Giovanni van Bronckhorst (born 1975), football player 
Greta Van Susteren (born 1954), Fox News journalist
Guido van Rossum (born 1956), inventor of the Python programming language
Gus Van Sant (born 1952), film director, screenwriter, painter, photographer, musician and author
Han van Meegeren (1889–1947), painter and ingenious art forger
Hendrik Willem van Loon (1882–1944), author, historian and journalist
Henry van de Velde (1863–1957), painter, architect and interior designer
Herman Van Springel (1943–2022), racing cyclist
Hoyt Vandenberg (1899–1954), second Chief of Staff of the Air Force of the United States for whom Vandenberg Air Force Base in California is named
Hubert van Es (1941–2009), photographer
Hubert van Eyck (c. 1385/90–1426), painter
Ivo Van Damme (1954–1976), middle-distance runner
Jacobus Henricus van 't Hoff (1852–1911), physical & organic chemist, first winner of the Nobel Prize in chemistry
Jacob van Campen (1596–1657), architect
Jacob van Ruisdael (c. 1629 – 1682), landscape painter
Jacob Veldhuyzen van Zanten (1927–1977), pilot
Jaap van Zweden (born 1960), violinist and conductor
James Van Allen (1914–2006), space scientist
James Van Fleet (1892–1992), U.S. four star general
James Van Der Beek (born 1977), television, film, and stage actor
Jan Baptist van Helmont (1579–1644), chemist & physician
Jan van Eyck (c. 1395 – 1441), painter
Jan van Riebeeck (1619–1677), colonial administrator and founder of Cape Town
Jean-Claude Van Damme (born 1960), martial artist, actor and director
Joan Van Ark (born 1943), actress, director
Johannes Diderik van der Waals (1837–1923), physicist
Johan van Oldenbarnevelt (1547–1619), statesman
Johnny Vander Meer (1914–1997), baseball player
John Hasbrouck Van Vleck (1899–1980), American physicist & mathematician, co-awarded the 1977 Nobel Prize in Physics
Jon van Rood (1926–2017), immunologist
Joost van den Vondel (1587–1679), writer & playwright
Joost van der Westhuizen (1971–2017), rugby player
Joran van der Sloot (born 1987), convicted murderer
José Van Dam (born 1940), singer
José van Dijck (born 1960), new media scholar, first female president of the Royal Netherlands Academy of Arts and Sciences
Kiliaen van Rensselaer (1586–1643), merchant
Lee Van Cleef (1925–1989), actor
Leslie van Houten, former Manson Family member and convicted murderer
Leontien van Moorsel (born 1970), cyclist
Louis van Gaal (born 1951), football player and manager
Ludwig Mies van der Rohe (1886–1969), German-American architect
Ludwig van Beethoven (1770–1827), composer and pianist
Mamie Van Doren (born 1931), actress, model, singer and sex symbol 
Marco van Basten (born 1964), football player, manager
Mariana van Zeller (born 1976), correspondent journalist
Marinus van der Lubbe (1909–1934), person executed for setting fire to the German Reichstag building 
Mario Van Peebles (born 1957), actor, director
Martin Van Buren (1782–1862), eighth president of the United States
Menno van Coehoorn (1641–1704), military engineer
Michael van Gerwen (born 1989), darts player
Michael Van Valkenburgh (born 1951)  landscape architect and educator
Monique van de Ven (born 1952), actress
Nick Van Exel (born 1971), basketball player
Olivier van Noort (1558–1627), explorer, first Dutchman to circumnavigate the world
Paul van Dyk (born 1971), DJ/music artist
Peter van Dievoet (1661–1729), sculptor and architect. 
Pierre van der Linden (born 1946), drummer and composer
Pieter van den Hoogenband (born 1978), swimmer
Rafael van der Vaart (born 1983), footballer
Raymond van Barneveld (born 1967), darts player
Raymond van het Groenewoud (1950), musician
Rembrandt van Rijn (1606–1669), painter
Rianne van Rompaey (born 1996), fashion model
Rik Van Looy (born 1933), cyclist
Rip Van Winkle fictional character from a short story by American author Washington Irving.
Rob Van Dam fictional wwe character (born 1970), pro wrestler
Robert J. Van de Graaff (1901–1967), physicist, developed the Van de Graaff generator 
Robin van Persie (born 1983), football player
Rogier van der Weyden (1400–1464), painter
Ronnie Van Zant (1948–1977), lead singer of the American rock band Lynyrd Skynyrd
Ruel Vincent van Dijk (born 2002), singer
Ruud van Nistelrooy (born 1976), football player
Simon van der Meer (1925–2011), particle accelerator physicist, Nobel Prize in Physics in 1984
Shane van Gisbergen (born 1989), race car driver
Sharon Van Etten (born 1981), American indie folk singer-songwriter and actor
Steven Van Zandt (born 1950), musician, songwriter, arranger, record producer, actor, and radio disc jockey
Thurop Van Orman (born 1976), cartoonist, animator, voice actor, screenwriter, produce, storyboard artist and director of The Angry Birds Movie 2 (2019)
Todd Van Poppel (born 1971), American baseball player
Todd Van Steensel (born 1991), Australian baseball player
Townes Van Zandt (1944–1997), musician, and songwriter
Vincent van Gogh (1853–1890), painter
Virgil van Dijk (born 1991), footballer
Wendelin Van Draanen (born 1965), author
Willebrord Snel van Royen (1580–1626), Dutch astronomer & mathematician
Willem van Oranje (1533–1584), nobleman, founder of the Dutch nation
Willem van Zeist (1924–2016), Dutch archaeobotanist and palynologist. 
Willem Hendrik van Oranje (1650–1702), Stadtholder of the United Provinces of the Netherlands (1672–1702) and King of England, Scotland, and Ireland (1689–1702)
Wolfgang Van Halen (born 1991), bassist of Van Halen
Wout Van Aert (born 1994), racing cyclist
Maerten Harpertsz Tromp, a famous Dutch admiral from the 17th century, was also known as Maerten Harpertsz van Tromp and even Maerten Harpertsz van der Tromp.

See also 

 Van Rensselaer (surname)
 Roosevelt (name), originally spelled "Van Rosevelt" or "Van Rosenvelt"
 Vanderbilt family
 Van Halen

Notes

References 

Dutch words and phrases
Dutch-language surnames